Awasari Khurd is a village in Ambegaon taluka of Pune district in the state of Maharashtra, India. The village is administrated by a Sarpanch who is an elected representative of village as per the constitution of India and Panchayati raj. Government College of Engineering and Research, Avasari Khurd ,the government engineering institute started on year 2009 & the Government Polytechnic, Awasari Khurd started in 2008 in the village.

References

External links
  Villages in pune maharashtra

Villages in Pune district